Kani is a town in north-western Ivory Coast. It is a sub-prefecture of and the seat of Kani Department in Worodougou Region, Woroba District. Kani is also a commune.
In 2014, the population of the sub-prefecture of Kani was 31,211.

Villages
The fifteen villages of the sub-prefecture of Kani and their population in 2014 are:

Notes

Sub-prefectures of Worodougou
Communes of Worodougou